Broughton Archipelago is a group of islands located at the eastern end of Queen Charlotte Strait in Mount Waddington Regional District, British Columbia. The archipelago is the traditional territory of the Musgamagw Dzawada'enuxw, Namgis, Ma'amtagila and Tlowitsis nations of the Kwakwaka'wakw peoples.

Etymology
Broughton Archipelago was named in 1792 by George Vancouver in honour of William Robert Broughton, the captain of the expedition's second ship, HMS Chatham.

Geography
The Broughton Archipelago includes numerous islands and islets scattered throughout the eastern end of Queen Charlotte Strait. Cormorant Island is the most densely populated island with 270 residents/km2 (710 residents/mi2) as of 2016.

The major islands of the Broughton Archipelago are as follows:

 Baker Island
 Bonwick Island
 Broughton Island
 Cormorant Island
 Crease Island
 East Cracroft Island
 Eden Island
 Gilford Island
 Hanson Island
 Harbledown Island
 Malcolm Island
 Midsummer Island
 Minstrel Island
 North Broughton Island
 Swanson Island
 Turnour Island
 Village Island
 Viscount Island
 Watson Island
 West Cracroft Island

Major waterways
Major waterways include Beware Passage, Broughton Strait, Clio Channel, Fife Sound, Johnstone Strait, Kingcome Inlet, Knight Inlet, Retreat Passage, Tribune Channel, and Wells Passage.

Conservation
The archipelago is rich in biodiversity and culturally significant sites. Protected areas include Broughton Archipelago Conservancy, Broughton Archipelago Provincial Park, Burdwood Group Conservancy, Cormorant Channel Marine Provincial Park, Echo Bay Marine Provincial Park, and Qwiquallaaq/Boat Bay Conservancy.

See also
Discovery Islands

References

External links 

 Broughton Archipelago sea lice study by Morton, Routledge, Peet and Ladwig

Central Coast of British Columbia
Archipelagoes of British Columbia
Kwakwaka'wakw